The supraglenoid tubercle is a region of the scapula from which the long head of the biceps brachii muscle originates. It is a small, rough projection superior to the glenoid cavity near the base of the coracoid process. The term supraglenoid is from the Latin supra, meaning above, and glenoid, meaning socket or cavity.

Clinical relevance

Biceps tendonitis 
Biceps tendonitis originates on the long head of the biceps brachii at the supraglenoid tubercle in 30% of cases. The main symptom is generally anterior biceps instability, but the disease can also be characterized by chronic anterior shoulder pain which radiates towards the lateral part of the elbow. In cases of biceps tendinitis, steroids can be injected fluoroscopically at the supraglenoid tubercle to reduce pain associated with the pathology.

Avulsion 
The supraglenoid tubercle ossifies separately from the rest of the scapula, so may not be as strong as the rest of the bone. It can be pulled off (avulsed), often after an excessively strong contraction of the biceps brachii. This may also cause a fracture of the surrounding parts of the scapula, particularly the glenoid cavity. This may also occur in horses. This type of bone fracture is quite rare.

Additional images

See also
 Infraglenoid tubercle

References

External links

 
 
 

Scapula